The Dodge Dakota, known as the Ram Dakota for the final two years of production, is a mid-size pickup truck from Chrysler's Ram (formerly Dodge Truck) division. The first Dakota was introduced in late 1986 as a 1987 model. From its introduction through 2009, it was marketed under the Dodge brand, and for the final two years under the Ram brand.

The Dakota was sized above the compact Ford Ranger and Chevrolet S-10, but below the full-sized pickups such as Dodge's own Ram. It is a conventional design with body-on-frame construction and a leaf spring/live axle rear end. The Dakota was the first mid-size pickup with an optional V8 engine.

The Dakota was nominated for the North American Truck of the Year award for 2000. 



First generation (1987–1996) 

The Dodge Dakota was developed by Chrysler as a mid-sized pickup. To keep investment low, many components were shared with existing Chrysler products and the manufacturing plant was shared with the full-sized Dodge D and W Models.

The N-body platform was the result of operational efforts by Harold K. Sperlich, who was in charge of Chrysler's product planning in the early 1980s. During that time the available Japanese-inspired compact pickups of the time lacked the size and features necessary to meet the demands of American buyers. In the late-1970s, Chrysler was still recovering from its near-bankruptcy and resources were in short supply. Sperlich challenged the N-Body team to search for all opportunities to reuse existing components to create the Dakota. The resulting highly investment-efficient program enabled Chrysler to create an all-new market segment at a low cost. Key individuals involved in making this product a reality included Glenn Gardner, Glen House, Robert Burnham, Don Sebert, Jim Hackstedde, and Clark Ewing. The Dakota platform spawned several variants Dakota Club and Quad Cabs as well as the Dodge Durango / Chrysler Aspen SUV.

The first generation of the Dakota was produced from 1986 through 1996 (for the 1987-1996 model years). The Dakota was the first pickup truck with rack and pinion steering (2WD only, and early years were available without power steering). Inline-four and V6 engines were offered along with either a five-speed manual or three-speed automatic transmission. Four-wheel drive was available only with the V6. Both 6.5- and 8-foot beds were offered. 

Additional options in first-generation trucks included:
 Lowered suspension
 15-inch chromed road wheels
 Chrome bars along the beds
 AM/FM stereo with cassette, and (optional) CD players
 Sliding rear windows
 Chromed bumpers
 V8 engines
 Infinity sound systems

The sport package was added as a mid-year release. Exterior colors came in black, bright white, and graphic red. Available in both 2WD and 4x4, the sport option included:
 AM/FM stereo radio with cassette player
 Carpeted logo floor mats
 Center armrest bench seat
 Charcoal-silver deluxe cloth interior with fold-down armrest
 Color-keyed leather-wrapped sport steering wheel
 Deluxe wipers
 Dual remote control outside mirrors
 Floor carpet
 Gauge package
 Mopar air dam with Bosch fog lamps
 Mopar light-bar with Bosch off-road lamps (4x4 only)
 Bodyside tape stripes
 Black grille and bumpers
 Sliding rear window
 3.9 L V6 engine
 15-inch aluminum wheels

Fuel injection was added to the 3.9 L V6 for 1988, but the rated output remained the same. Power windows and locks were now optional.

For 1989, the Dakota convertible was introduced. It featured a fixed roll bar and a simple manual top. The idea came from Jerry York and they were manufactured by ASC (American Sunroof Company). About 2,482 were sold during the first year.

Another addition that year was Carroll Shelby's V8-powered Shelby Dakota, his first rear-wheel drive vehicle in two decades.

An extended Club Cab model was added for 1990, still with two doors. This model offered six-passenger seating, though the rear seat was best suited for cargo, children, and shorter adults.

The 1991 model year featured a new grille and hood for better access with optional  5.2 L V8, which was included with the previous Shelby Dakota V8 option. By the end of 1991, the standard square sealed-beam glass headlamps were phased out for the aerodynamic-style molded plastic headlamps attached to the grill components. It was equipped with halogen lights, making 1991 the only model year for a unique front-end for the Dakota. Also debuting on 1991 models were six-bolt road wheels (replacing the earlier five-bolt versions). 

This was the last year for the Dakota convertible. To fulfill the Dodge division's commitment to the American Sunroof Company, production of the convertible version was extended into the 1991 model year. A total of eight were built. Unlike the previous years, colors and options varied more than before. This version was not advertised and did not appear in sales literature.

The 1994 model year had a few minor changes, with the most notable being the addition of a standard driver's-side airbag, located in a new, two-spoke steering wheel (also found in the Ram). Other changes included the discontinuation of the "SE" and "LE" trims. In following with the all-new Ram full-sized pickups, the top-end trim was renamed to "SLT", with these models (along with select others) including new chrome-finished, styled six-bolt steel wheels styled similar to the five-bolt type found on the larger Ram. Other changes included revisions to color and overall trim options. SRS airbags were also added for 1994. A CD player became optional, as did a combination cassette player and CD player unit. Leather seats were also available on LE models. New alloy wheels were available.

The 1996 model was the final year of the first-generation. The base K-based 2.5 L SOHC I4 engine was discontinued and had been considered vastly underpowered compared to the competition. This was the only major change for 1996, and the AMC 2.5 L engine continued as the standard engine in the new, larger 1997 model.

Li'l Red Express Dakota and Dakota Warrior 

Two special editions of the first were constructed with step-side beds. Both were constructed by L.E.R. Industries of Edwardsburg, Michigan. The step-side beds were constructed out of fiberglass and galvanneal. Wooden bed rails were also available.

The Li'l Red Express Dakota was made to resemble the original 1978–1979 Express models that were based on the Dodge D-Series. It featured the step-side bed and dual vertical exhaust stacks behind the cab that were non-functional. The Dakota Warrior was made to resemble the Warlock trim from the late 1970s. Warriors included the bed as the Dakota Express, but lacked the vertical exhaust stacks. Both the Express and Warrior Dakotas had a graphics package made to resemble those of the original models.

Production numbers for the Expresses and Warriors were in the hundreds. A few were made with the 5.2 L Magnum V8 engine, which was only an option during 1992, the final model year of Express and Warrior.

Models 

The 1987–1996 Dodge Dakota came in three basic models:

The Dakota S was the base trim level. It included the following standard features: base vinyl seating surfaces, radio delete package, and audio system delete package (later, an AM/FM stereo with a two-speaker audio system became standard equipment on the Dakota model with a two-speaker audio system), a heater with fan control, vinyl flooring, a black front grille and front bumper, full-faced steel wheels, all-season tires, and manual "roll-up" windows and door locks. A black painted back step bumper, air conditioning, AM/FM or AM/FM/Cassette radio, and power steering were extra-cost options. This model was not typically seen as a Club Cab model, and also was not available with a V8 engine option like the other Dakota models were.

The Sport was the mid-range trim level. It added features such as vinyl-and-cloth-trimmed seating surfaces, an AM/FM stereo with a two-speaker audio system, sport-styled steel wheels, bodyside cladding delete, a tilt-adjustable steering column and wheel, and interior accents to the base Dakota model. Later, it also added chrome-clad steel wheels, as well as a color-keyed front fascia and front grille, and "Sport" decals that adorned the doors and pickup bed sides of the Dakota. V6 and V8 engines were available on the Sport model.

The Sport convertible was the only convertible Dakota available, and only from 1989 until 1991, when it was discontinued. It added the following features to the mid-range Sport trim level: sport-styled alloy wheels, cloth seating surfaces with vinyl inserts and accents, an AM/FM stereo with cassette player and a four-speaker audio system, air conditioning, a manual-folding vinyl convertible roof, and "Sport" decals on the doors of the Dakota. The V6 engine and two-door regular cab was the only available configuration of the Sport convertible.

The LE, later renamed SLT, was the top-of-the-line trim level. It added features such as cloth seating surfaces, air conditioning, an AM/FM stereo with cassette player and a four-speaker audio system, alloy wheels, bodyside cladding, carpeted flooring, and power windows and door locks to the mid-range Sport model. V6 and V8 engines were available on LE or SLT models.

Engines 
 1987–1988 -  K I4, SOHC, 
 1987–1991 -  LA V6, 
 1989–1995 -  K I4, 
 1991 -  LA V8, 
 1992–1993 -  Magnum V6, 
 1992–1993 -  Magnum V8, 
 1994–1996 -  Magnum V6, 
 1994–1996 -  Magnum V8, 
 1996 -  AMC I4,

Second generation (1997–2004) 

The second-generation Dakota began development in 1991, with an exterior design proposal by Dennis Myles under design director John R. Starr being approved in mid-1993 and frozen for production in January 1994, 30 months ahead of Job 1. Design patents were filed on May 20, 1994, under D373,979 at the USPTO. The 1997 model year Dakota was unveiled via press release in the summer of 1996 and built from July 1996 through July 2004. It inherited the semi truck look of the larger Ram, but remained largely the same underneath although steering was updated on 2-wheel drive models to rack and pinion as a part of the re-design. That year had the introduction of the 'R/T' model with the 5.9 L  Magnum V8.

In the spring of 1998, a new limited-edition R/T package was available as an option on the Dakota Sport model from 1998-2003. This version is considered a true street/sport truck, only available in RWD. Factory modifications such as a 360 cid/5.9-liter V8 which produced  at 4,400 rpm and 345 foot-pounds of torque at 3,200 rpm. The only transmission choice available was the 46RE four-speed automatic, performance axle, limited-slip differential, sport suspension and steering, upgraded brakes, performance exhaust, special 17x9-inch cast aluminum wheels, monotone paint, bucket seats, and many other standard options came with the package. Chrome wheels were available on 2002 and 2003 models. Some of the last models made in 2003 came with the new stampede lower body cladding package and a chromed version of the original cast 17x9 aluminum wheels at no extra charge. This version of the R/T Dakota was produced through 2003, with the newer 2003 R/T trucks designated as their own trim line, and no longer as part of an option package on the Dakota Sport trim. The Dakota R/T could accelerate from 0 to 60 mph (97 km/h) in 6.9 seconds and complete a quarter-mile sprint in just over 15 seconds. The RT Package: The R/T package included additional upgrades. It came with a performance-tuned suspension, quicker steering gear, thicker stabilizer bars front and rear, P255/55R17 tires, and a ride height that was 1-inch lower than the standard Dakota.

Also in 1998, the Dakota R1 was released for production in Brazil through the efforts of a small team known as Truck Special Programs and featured a base four-cylinder engine and offered a 2.5L VMI turbodiesel along with a V8, all designed around a reinforced four-wheel drive chassis used on both two- and four-wheel drive models. Altogether, 28 roll-in-chassis R1 configurations were designed for the Brazilian market to be built at the Curitiba assembly facility as CKDs. This program was canceled when Chrysler was purchased by Daimler.

Gone for 2000 was the 8-foot bed on the regular cab, but new for this year was the Quad Cab. Four-door Quad Cab models had a slightly shorter bed, but riding on the Club Cab's  wheelbase. The Quad Cab featured a full-sized flip-up rear seat to provide room for three passengers in the back or room for cargo. The aging 5.2 L Magnum V8 was replaced by the 4.7 L SOHC PowerTech V8 this year, and the new 45RFE automatic transmission was introduced.

A revision of the interior was made for the 2001 models, including a completely redesigned dash, door panels, and revised seats. Other minor trim revisions were made, including redesigned aluminum wheels on various models. All vehicles also got new radio options. Only the standard AM/FM radio (with no cassette deck) was discontinued, making an AM/FM radio with a cassette deck standard on all models. AM/FM stereo CD and cassette/CD variants were also available.

The 2002 model was the final year for the four-cylinder engine in the Dakota, as Chrysler ended production of the American Motors Corporation design. Most were built with the V6 or V8 engines that were more powerful. An automatic transmission was not available with the four-cylinder engine. SIRIUS Satellite Radio was also now available as an option, and revised radios with new wiring harnesses could accommodate this new feature. A CD changer radio was also available, eliminating the need for a separately mounted unit located elsewhere inside the truck. The drivers could load up to six discs into the unit at a time and could switch out the discs at any time. Radio Data System became standard equipment on some radios.

The 2003 model was the end of the OHV V6 and the big R/T V8; the 2004 model year vehicles were available with a new 3.7 L Magnum V6 engine and the 4.7 L V8 variant.

In 2004, the cassette deck option was discontinued, and a CD player became standard equipment on all models.

This generation was also assembled and sold in Brazil from 1998 to 2001.

The IIHS gave this generation a 'Poor' rating in the frontal offset crash test.

Trim levels 
The 1997 to 2004 Dodge Dakota was available in several different trim levels:

The ST served as the base model of the Dakota. It included features such as an A/M-F/M stereo (later with cassette player) and a four-speaker sound system, vinyl-trimmed seating surfaces, front (or front and rear) bench seats, styled steel fifteen-inch (later sixteen-inch) wheels, and vinyl flooring. It also included, and was only available with, the 3.9L (later 3.7L) V6 engine. The ST was also not offered as a four-door Quad Cab model.

The Sport served as the "step-up" Dakota model. It added the following features to the ST model: an A/M-F/M stereo with a cassette player (later, a single-disc CD player), cloth seating surfaces, sport-styled alloy wheels, and carpeted flooring. It was available with all engines except for the high-performance 5.9L V8 engine.

The SXT, introduced for the 2001 model year served as the "mid-range" Dakota model. It added the following features to the Sport model: an A/M-F/M stereo with a single-disc CD player, air conditioning, power windows and door locks with keyless entry (available as an option), and a premium interior. It was available with all engines except for the high-performance 5.9L V8 engine. An SXT Plus model was available that added "value" features such as an A/M-F/M stereo with cassette and single-disc CD players with integral CD changer controls, a premium cloth interior, and sixteen-inch alloy wheels mounted on sixteen-inch tires.

The SLT was the "top-line" Dakota model from late 2000. It added the following features to the SXT model (2001 to 2004 model years) or the Sport model (1997 to 2000 model years): power windows and door locks (Sport only) with keyless entry, a premium interior (Sport only), and premium-styled alloy or chrome-clad wheels. It was available with all available engines on the Dakota. An SLT Plus Package was available that added "value" features to the SLT model, such as sixteen-inch alloy wheels, sixteen-inch tires, an A/M-F/M stereo with cassette and CD players (and integral CD changer controls on 2001 through 2004 year models), a premium cloth interior, and more "upscale" features.

The R/T, otherwise known as the 5.9 R/T was known as the "high-performance" and "top-line" Dakota model from 1997 to 2003. It added the following features to the SLT model: sport front seats, sport-styled chrome-clad wheels, larger performance-rated tires, an A/M-F/M stereo with cassette and single-disc CD players, a six-speaker Infinity amplified premium audio system, and the high-performance 5.9L V8 engine. It was available in all available Dakota models except for the 4-door Quad Cab model.

Engines

Third generation (2005–2011) 

The redesigned 2005 Dakota still shared its platform with the new Dodge Durango SUV (which was now even more similar to the Ram platform). This model is  longer and  wider, and features a new front and rear suspension, and rack-and-pinion steering. This new generation model also reverted to five-lug wheels from the prior generation's six-lug wheels due to cost and assembly time-saving measures. The Dakota is built at the Warren Truck Assembly plant in Warren, Michigan.

A V6 and two V8 engines were available: The standard engine is a 3.7 L Magnum V6; the two 4.7 L V8 engines are the standard Magnum V8 and the V8 High Output or HO. Both the 3.7 L and standard output 4.7 L V8s were available with the six-speed manual transmission in 2005 and 2006. For 2007, that option was deleted on the V8 models.

In addition to a refresh of the styling, this generation was not offered in a regular cab model. Only the Club and Quad Cab configurations were available. The Dakota R/T returned in late 2005 for the 2006 year model, but only with cosmetic modifications. Despite the "R/T" moniker which signifies "Road and Track", the newest Dakota R/T was simply an option package, characterized by a non-functional hood scoop, exclusive gauge cluster, and hockey stick-style side stripes. The package was available on both two- and four-wheel drive models.

The facelifted third-generation Dakota was unveiled at the 2007 Chicago Auto Show as a 2008 model. The Dakota received another facelift and interior upgrade along with a few other upgrades, including built-in cargo-box utility rails, heated bench seats, best-in-class towing (up to ), the largest and longest standard bed in the class, and the largest mid-size truck cab. Production began in August 2007.

As of 2010, the Dakota was considered a part of the Ram lineup. However, the "Dodge" emblem still existed on the tailgate, and the truck was interchangeably referred to as a Ram Dakota or Dodge Dakota. Its Mitsubishi Raider sibling was discontinued in 2009.

The IIHS gave this generation a 'Good' rating in the frontal offset crash test.

Models 
Throughout its production run, the 2005 to 2011 Dodge Dakota was available in three basic models:

The ST served as the base Dakota model. It included the following features: sixteen-inch styled steel wheels, sixteen-inch tires, front cloth bench seats, vinyl-trimmed seating surfaces, manual windows and door locks, black plastic bumpers, an A/M-F/M stereo with a single-disc CD player (later, single-disc CD/MP3 player), and auxiliary audio input jack (on most models), a four-speaker sound system, air conditioning, a 3.7L "Power-Tech" V6 engine came standard, or the optional 4.7L "Power-Tech" V8 Engine also available on the ST model.

The SLT served as the "mid-level" Dakota model. It added the following features to the base ST model: sixteen-inch sport-styled alloy wheels, cloth seating surfaces, and power windows and door locks with keyless entry. The SLT was available with any engine offered on the Dakota. A Big Horn (all states other than Texas), or Lonestar (Texas Only) Package was also available for the SLT model, which included "value-added" features, as was an SXT Package that added a color-keyed front grille, color-keyed front and rear bumpers as well as sport cloth seating surfaces.

The Laramie, otherwise known as the SLT Laramie, was the "top-line" Dakota model. It added the following features to the "mid-level" SLT model: seventeen-inch chrome-clad alloy wheels, seventeen-inch tires, an A/M-F/M stereo with a six-disc, in-dash CD/MP3 changer and auxiliary audio input jack (on most models), a premium Infinity (later Alpine) six-speaker amplified audio system, leather-trimmed heated seating surfaces, power front seats, a security system, a five-speed automatic transmission, and the base 4.7L "Power-Tech" V8 engine, though the high-output version of the same engine was also available on the Laramie or SLT Laramie.

Discontinuation 
The third-generation Dakota was discontinued in 2011, with the last unit coming off the assembly line on August 23, 2011, ending the truck's 25-year run. As of 2011, according to Sergio Marchionne, the CEO of Chrysler Group, the Dakota will probably not be replaced by a similar vehicle, mostly due to declining popularity of compact trucks on the North American market (see Ford Ranger for similar outcome). Another problem was that buyers complained that the smaller pickup was not priced lower than the full-sized Ram 1500; nevertheless, the Dakota's return continues to be reported since 2012. Fiat Chrysler Automobiles announced in September 2014 an agreement with Mitsubishi Motors to codevelop the next-generation Mitsubishi Triton/L200 to be sold globally by both companies. It is sold as RAM 1200 in some Middle Eastern countries.

Sales

References

External links 

 Dodge Dakota at Allpar
 Dakota USA Truck forums all about the Dodge Dakota

Dakota
All-wheel-drive vehicles
Cars introduced in 1986
1990s cars
2000s cars
2010s cars
Pickup trucks
Rear-wheel-drive vehicles
Police vehicles
Cars discontinued in 2011